Remigio dei Girolami (1235–1319) was an Italian Dominican theologian. He was an early pupil of Thomas Aquinas.

His Tractatus de bono communi of 1302 is a significant work of political thought.  Remigio was able to adapt the political thought of Aquinas, which emphasized monarchy, to the communal regimes of Italy.

Two of his works, the Divisio scientie and Contra falsos ecclesie professores, discuss music. He thought the church represented all human sciences, including the musical sciences that formed part of the quadrivium. The musical element (modulatio) of these sciences referred to liturgical chants, preaching, and church order.

References
 Charles Davis, "Remigio de' Girolami and Dante: A Comparison of Their Conceptions of Peace," Studi danteschi 36 (1959): 105-36.
 Charles Davis, An Early Florentine Political Theorist: Fra Remigio dei Girolami, Proceedings of the American Philosophical Society 104 (1960), 667; reprinted in Dante's Italy, 198-223. Philadelphia, 1984.
 Charles Davis, "Remigio de' Girolami O.P. (d. 1319): Lector of S. Maria Novella in Florence," in Le scuole degli ordini mendicanti (secolo XIII-XIV), 281-304. Todi, 1978.

Notes

External links

 

1235 births
1319 deaths
14th-century Italian Roman Catholic theologians
Italian Dominicans
Dominican theologians
13th-century Italian Roman Catholic theologians
14th-century Latin writers
13th-century Latin writers
Dominican Order in Florence